The 1949 Saint Vincent Bearcats football team represented Saint Vincent College during the 1949 college football season. In head coach Al DeLuca's second year, the Bearcats compiled a 10–0 record, shut out eight of their ten opponents, and outscored their opponents by a total of 234 to 12.  1949 remains the only undefeated season in program history, the best defensive showing with only twelve points allowed, and their second best offensive showing. The Bearcats were invited to the Tangerine Bowl, where they defeated Emory and Henry, which came into the bowl with an 11–0 record.

Schedule

References

Saint Vincent
Saint Vincent Bearcats football seasons
Citrus Bowl champion seasons
College football undefeated seasons
Saint Vincent Bearcats football